This is part of a list of Statutes of New Zealand for the period of the First Labour Government of New Zealand up to and including part of the first year of the First National Government of New Zealand.

1930s

1936  

 Agricultural Workers Act  Amended: 1937/77/79/80/81/82/83/84/85/87
 Ashburton Rivers Act 
 Chatham Islands County Council Empowering Act  Amended: 1963
 Employment Promotion Act 
 Fair Rents Act  Amended: 1937/39/41/42/47
 Geneva Convention Act 
 Industrial Efficiency Act 
 Law Reform Act 1936  Amended: 1955/57/96
 League of Nations Sanctions Regulations Confirmation Act 
 Michael Connelly Appointment Validation Act 
 Mortgagors and Lessees Rehabilitation Act  Amended: 1937/61
 Political Disabilities Removal Act  Amended: 1950
 Prevention of Profiteering Act 
 Primary Products Marketing Act  Amended: 1937/54/63/72/74/75/77/81/82/83/85/87/93/97
 Protection of British Shipping Act 
 Regulations Act  Amended: 1959/62/66/70
 Southland Electric-power Supply Act 
 State Advances Corporation Act  Amended: 1937/51/53/59/61/64/68/70/72
 Sumner Borough Empowering Act 
 Taupiri Drainage and River Board Empowering Act 
 United Wheatgrowers Act 
 Whakatane Paper Mills, Limited, Water-supply Empowering Act 
 William George David Brown Trust Act 
 Wool Industry Promotion Act 
Plus 33 Acts amended

1937  

 Air Department Act 
 Air Force Act  Amended: 1947
 Army Board Act 
 Cawthron Institute Trust Board Rating Exemption Act 
 Christchurch Tramway Board Empowering Act 
 Greymouth Harbour Board Reconstitution Act 
 Iron and Steel Industry Act  Amended: 1965/88
 Motueka Borough Council Empowering Act 
 Nelson Diocesan Trust Board Empowering Act 
 Ngaruawahia Borough Council Empowering Act 
 Petroleum Act  Amended: 1953/55/62/65/67/74/75/80/82/85/88
 Physical Welfare and Recreation Act 
 Sale of Wool Act 
 School of Agriculture Act 
 Share-milking Agreements Act 
 Sovereign's Birthday Observance Act 
 Thames Valley Drainage Board Empowering Act  Amended: 1979
 Whangarei Airport Act 
Plus 29 Acts amended

1938  

 Carter Observatory Act  Amended: 1972/77/81/88
 Cornwall Park Trustees Rating Exemption Act 
 Dunedin Drainage and Sewerage Board Empowering Act 
 Joint Council of the Order of St John and The New Zealand Red Cross Society In Act 
 King George the Fifth Memorial Fund Act 
 Lower Clutha River Improvement Act  Amended: 1939/43
 Nelson City Empowering Act 
 New Zealand Centennial Act 
 New Zealand Council of Law Reporting Act  Amended: 1964/97/2006
 Palmerston North City Council Empowering Act 
 Paritutu Centennial Park Act 
 Social Security Act  Amended: 1939/40/41/43/45/46/47/49/50/51/53/54/55/56/57/58/59/60/61/62/63/64/66/67/68/69/70/71/72/73/74/75/76/77/78/79/80/81/82/83/84/85/86/87/88/89/90/91/92/93/94/96/97/98/2000/01/05/06/07
 Stallions Act 
 Surveyors Act  Amended: 1960/62/71/72/76
 Tauranga Borough Council Empowering Act 
 Wellington City Housing Act 
Plus 12 Acts amended

1939  

 Adhesive Stamps Act 
 Bluff Borough Empowering Act 
 Domestic Proceedings Act  Amended: 1958/70/71/72/74/75/76/78
 Emergency Regulations Act  Amended: 1940/41/42/43/44/45/46/48/49/50/51/52/53/54/55/56/57/58/59/60/61/62/63
 Hire-purchase Agreements Act 
 Legal Aid Act  Amended: 1970/71/74/76/80/83/86
 Meat Act  Amended: 1947/53/57/61/62/63/66/68/72/73/74/75/76/78/79/80/82/83/85/87/88/91/92/99
 New Zealand Library Association Act 
 Papanui Memorial Hall Enabling Act 
 Reserves and Other Lands Disposal Act  Amended: 2000
 Rural Housing Act  Amended: 1940/56/68/70
 Summary Penalties Act 
 Visiting Forces Act  Amended: 1957/61/81/97
 Wages Protection and Contractors' Liens Act  Amended: 1914/52/58/61
 Waikato Airport Act 
 War Expenses Act  Amended: 1942
Plus 22 Acts amended

1940s

1940  
 Carriage by Air Act  Amended: 1961/90/96
 Excess Profits Tax Act 
 Insurance Companies Act 
 Invercargill City Council Tramway Depreciation Fund Empowering Act 
 Mokau Harbour Act 
 National Savings Act  Amended: 1956/59/60
 Termites Act  Amended: 1963/64
 Waitara Borough Empowering Act 
 Waitara Harbour Act 
 War Pensions Extension Act 
Plus 14 Acts amended

1941  
 Auckland Centennial Memorial Park Act  Amended: 1947/52/62/83
 Auckland Community Welfare Centre and Auckland City Empowering Act  Amended: 1948
 Awatere County Empowering Act 
 Christchurch City Empowering and Special Rates Consolidation Act 
 Counties Insurance Empowering Act  Amended: 1980
 Kitchener Memorial Scholarship Trust Act  Amended: 1983
 Lower Hutt City Empowering and Rates Consolidation Act 
 Manaukau County Council Empowering Act 
 National Development Loans Act 
 Prolongation of Parliament Act 
 Rehabilitation Act (New Zealand)|Rehabilitation Act  Amended: 1944/47/52/53/55/57/59/63/69/86
 Soil Conservation and Rivers Control Act  Amended: 1946/48/52/54/57/58/59/60/61/62/63/64/65/67/68/69/70/71/72/73/77/79/80/82/83/87/88
 Standards Act  Amended: 1950/69/72/81/2003/06
 War Damage Act  Amended: 1942
 Wellington Free Ambulance Act 
Plus 9 Acts amended

1942  
 Auckland City Housing Act 
 Auckland City Market Empowering Act 
 Homewood Trust Act  Amended: 1952/79
 Invercargill City Special Rate Empowering Act 
 Makerua Drainage Board Empowering Act 
 Medical Advertisements Act 
 Mina Tait Horton Estate Act  Amended: 1955/57
 Overseas Representatives Act 
 Women Jurors Act 
Plus 10 Acts amended

1943  
 By-elections Postponement Act 
 Canterbury Jewish Cemetery Empowering Act 
 Commercial Gardens Registration Act 
 Island Territories Act 
 Ministry of Works Act 
 Morris Divorce and Marriage Validation Act 
 Napier Borough Empowering Act 
 Otaki and Porirua Trusts Act  Amended: 1946/69/77
 Papawai and Kaikokirikiri Trusts Act  Amended: 1946/72
 Servicemen's Settlement and Land Sales Act  Amended: 1945/46/48
Plus 13 Acts amended

1944  
 Annual Holidays Act  Amended: 1945/50/62/74/76
 Auckland Metropolitan Drainage Act  Amended: 1947/48/51/55/63
 Carterton Borough Empowering Act 
 Clerks of Works Act  Amended: 1961/63/66/74/76/80/87/88
 Earthquake and War Damage Act  Amended: 1951/64/67/79/83/85/86/87/88/91
 Frustrated Contracts Act 1944  Amended: 2002
 Hawke's Bay Crematorium Act  Amended: 1967
 Invercargill Licensing Committee Act 
 Invercargill Licensing Trust Act  Amended: 1954/67/69/74/78/85/86/88
 Lower Hutt City Empowering and Vesting Act 
 Milk Act  Amended: 1947/51/53/55/56/58/62/70/71/73/78/80/82/87
 Ngaitahu Claim Settlement Act 
 Petone and Lower Hutt Gas-lighting Empowering Act 
 Quarries Act  Amended: 1951/54/61/72/73/75/77/80
 Taranaki Maori Claims Settlement Act 
 United Nations Relief and Rehabilitation Administration Act 
 Wool Industry Act  Amended: 1950/52/61/64/66/78/81/83/88
Plus 14 Acts amended

1945  
 Ashburton Borough Special Rates Consolidation Act 
 Atomic Energy Act  Amended: 1957/59
 Balclutha Housing Act 
 Bush Workers Act  Amended: 1967/78/79/81/83
 Criminal Appeal Act 
 Diplomatic Privileges Extension Act 
 Electricity Act  Amended: 1948/55/56/58/59/61/64/65/66/67/69/72/73/75/76/80/82/83/86/87/90/93/97/2000/01/03/04/05/06/07
 Employment Act 
 Housing Improvement Act  Amended: 1955
 Invercargill City Housing Act 
 John Duncan McGruer Estate Act 
 Linen Flax Corporation Act  Amended: 1956/74
 Maori Social and Economic Advancement Act  Amended: 1951/61
 Marianne Caughey Preston Estate Act 
 Masterton Borough Housing Act 
 Minimum Wage Act  Amended: 1947/49/50/51/52/68/74/87/90/91/2003/07
 New Zealand Council for Educational Research Act  Amended: 1976/91/2001
 New Zealand National Airways Act  Amended: 1948/56/57/58/60/64/65/73/75
 Nurses and Midwives Act  Amended: 1957/60/62/63/65/67
 Standard Time Act  Amended: 1956
 Waimairi County Electrical Supply and Christchurch City Empowering Act 
 Wool Disposal Act 
Plus 24 Acts amended

1946  
 Dilworth Trust Board Act 
 Land Subdivision in Counties Act  Amended: 1953/54/55/58/59
 Local Government Commission Act  Amended: 1962/63/64/69
 Lyttelton Borough Empowering Act 
 Nassella Tussock Act  Amended: 1948/53/59/65/68/70/72/74
 New Zealand Geographic Board Act  Amended: 1988
 Ngaitahu Trust Board Act 
 South Canterbury Catchment Board Act 
 Stock-foods Act 
 Tahunanui Town Board Empowering Act 
 United Nations Act  Amended: 1990
 Veterinary Services Act  Amended: 1948/54/55/59/62/79/80/81
 Waikato-Maniapoto Maori Claims Settlement Act 
 Waimakariri Harbour Act 
 Wairoa Harbour Act 
Plus 21 Acts amended

1947  
 Adult Education Act 
 Canterbury Museum Trust Board Act 
 Central Waikato Electric-power Board Empowering Act 
 Contributory Negligence Act 
 Control of Prices Act  Amended: 1953/56/58/69/70/71
 Dairy Products Marketing Commission Act  Amended: 1948/50/51/53/56/57/58/60
 Emergency Regulations Continuance Act 
 Food and Drugs Act  Amended: 1956/57/62
 Forest and Rural Fires Act  Amended: 1948/51/52/62/63/87/89/90/96/2000/05
 International Air Services Licensing Act  Amended: 1951/65
 J R McKenzie Trust Act  Amended: 1970
 Lake Taupo Compensation Claims Act  Amended: 1976
 Maori Purposes Act 
 Masteron Licensing Trust Act 
 Masterton Licensing Restoration Act 
 Paeroa Borough Water-supply Empowering Act 
 Patriotic and Canteen Funds Act  Amended: 1948/49/50/51/52/53/56/60/64/67/70/73/79/87/2005
 Reporoa Drainage Board Empowering Act 
 Riverton Borough Empowering Act 
 Royal Titles Act 
 Statute of Westminster Adoption Act 
 Superannuation Act 1947  Amended: 1945/46/48/50/51/53/54/55/57/58/59/60/61/62/63/64/65/66/67/68/69/70/71/72/73/74
 Supply Regulations Act  Amended: 1948/49/50/51/52
 Waerenga-a-hika Trust Act 
Plus 38 Acts amended

1948  
 Apple and Pear Marketing Act  Amended: 1950/51/54/59/60/62/67/68/74/77/79/80/81/82/86/87/88/93
 Armed Forces Canteens Act  Amended: 1956/62/67/72/88
 Auckland Baptist Tabernacle Act 
 Auckland City Council and Auckland Harbour Board Empowering Act 
 British Nationality and New Zealand Citizenship Act  Amended: 1959/62/65/69/73
 Bryant House Trust Board Enabling Act 
 Civil Aviation Act  Amended: 1955/58/60/61/62/63/69/70/71/75/76/77/82/87/88/89/91/92/93/96/99/2002/04/05/07
 Coal Act 
 Economic Stabilization Act 
 Gaming Poll Act 
 General Agreement on Tariffs and Trade Act 
 Government Service Tribunal Act  Amended: 1949/50/52/55
 Hutt Valley Drainage Act  Amended: 1949/52/53/58/64/71/74/78
 Invercargill City Gasworks and Electricity Empowering Act 
 Land Valuation Court Act  Amended: 1956/60/61/64/65/66/67
 Sutton Adoption Act 
 Tenancy Act  Amended: 1950/53/57/58/61/64/68/77
 Tokelau Islands Act  Amended: 1963/67/69/70/71/74
 Trades Certification Act  Amended: 1972/78/82/87/88
 Trustee Savings Banks Act  Amended: 1956/57/58/61/62/64/66/68/69/70/72/75/76/77/78/79/82
 Tuberculosis Act  Amended: 1950/57/58/73
 Valuers Act  Amended: 1959/68/70/74/77/80/81/83/91/94/97/2005
 Westport Coal Company Act 
Plus 51 Acts amended and 2 Acts repealed.

1949  
 Auckland Harbour Development Act 
 Balclutha Borough Council Empowering Act 
 Deckston Hebrew Trust Act 
 Education Lands Act  Amended: 1950/56/60/67/75/79/91
 Fire Services Act  Amended: 1952/53/56/57/58/59/61/62/63/65/66/67/68/69/70/71/74/75
 George and Annie Troup Trust Act 
 Industrial Relations Act  Amended: 1963/74/75/76/77/78/79/80/81/82/83/84/85
 Licensing Trusts Act  Amended: 1950/51/53/55/59/61/62/64/67/68/69/70/71/72/74/75/76/77/78/80/85/86/88
 Military Training Act  Amended: 1951/52/53/54/56
 Military Training Poll Act 
 New Zealand Counties Association Act  Amended: 1956/67/73/76/80
 Occupational Therapy Act  Amended: 1954/59/64/72/80/94/99
 Physiotherapy Act  Amended: 1953/61/64/69/72/74/82/94/99/2000
 Radioactive Substances Act 
 Thames Borough Council Empowering Act 
 Transport Act  Amended: 1950/53/54/55/58/59/60/61/63/64/65/66/67/68/69/70/71/72/73/74/75/76/77/78/79/80/82/83/84/85/86/87/88/89/90/92/95/97/2000
 Whaingaroa Domain Disposal Act 
 Whangarei Milk Authority Empowering Act 
 Wool Labelling Act  Amended: 1957/69/75
Plus 27 Acts amended

See also 
The above list may not be current and will contain errors and omissions. For more accurate information try:
 Walter Monro Wilson, The Practical Statutes of New Zealand, Auckland: Wayte and Batger 1867
 The Knowledge Basket: Legislation NZ
 New Zealand Legislation Includes some Imperial and Provincial Acts. Only includes Acts currently in force, and as amended.
 Legislation Direct List of statutes from 2003 to order

Lists of statutes of New Zealand